Jacqueline Elizabeth Laurita (née Grippe, formerly Holmes; born April 26, 1970)  is an American television personality, known for starring in The Real Housewives of New Jersey (2009–14, 2016).

Career
Since 2009, Laurita has appeared on The Real Housewives of New Jersey. In 2014, Laurita departed the series; however, she made appearances throughout the season, before returning for Season 7. In April 2017, Laurita announced she would not be returning for good for the series' upcoming eighth season.

In addition to appearing on the series, she also appeared on Manzo'd with Children. She also had a small role in Bad Parents directed by Cathya Jentis. In 2016, Laurita co-wrote Get It!: The Busy Girl's Guide to Getting Your "It" Together: A Beauty, Style, and Wellness Book alongside Jenè Luciani.

Personal life
Laurita was born in Las Vegas, Nevada. She was married to Matt Holmes from 1989 to 1992, with whom she shares a daughter, Ashlee (formerly Ashley). She later remarried to Chris Laurita and had two sons with him, C.J. and Nicholas. Her son Nicholas was diagnosed with autism. Her husband operates a popcorn company, The Little Kernel, with profits that are donated to a foundation which provides resources to parents with children on the autism spectrum.

Laurita's first grandchild, Cameron Hendrix Malleo, was born on August 30, 2016, to Laurita's daughter, Ashlee Holmes, and Pete Malleo. Holmes married Malleo in August 2018.

In 2019, Laurita moved back to Las Vegas with her husband and their two sons.

References

External links
 
 

Living people
American women writers
The Real Housewives cast members
1970 births
21st-century American women